Ruben Van Hirtum (born 10 April 1990) is a Belgian volleyball player for Knack Randstad Roeselare and the Belgian national team.

He participated at the 2017 Men's European Volleyball Championship.

References

1990 births
Living people
Belgian men's volleyball players